Osinki is a rural locality (a village) in Ilkinskoye Rural Settlement, Melenkovsky District, Vladimir Oblast, Russia. The population was 271 as of 2010. There are 3 streets.

Geography 
Osinki is located on the Unzha River, 13 km south of Melenki (the district's administrative centre) by road. Ilkino is the nearest rural locality.

References 

Rural localities in Melenkovsky District